Widi language may refer to:

Wiri language, an extinct Aboriginal language of eastern Queensland, Australia
A possible dialect of Badimaya language, in Western Australia

See also 
 Widi (disambiguation)